Házael González (born 18 February 1976, Zarréu, Asturias) is a Spanish writer, specializing in fantasy literature. His most well-known work is the literary cycle Historias de la Tierra Incontable, published since 2012.

Biography 
He has a degree in Art History from the University of Barcelona (UB) and a Master in Cultural Heritage (Research and Management) from the University of the Balearic Islands (UIB). In addition to his role as a writer, he collaborates every fortnight as a columnist for the newspaper Ultima Hora and for the web magazine specializing in fantastic cinema, Scifiworld, writing reviews on fantasy literature. 
In addition, he has worked as a film and comic critic in specialized magazines such as Volumen Dos, Top Cómic, Hentai, Wizard or Dolmen.

He has also been a radio host on stations such as Ona Mallorca or IB3 Ràdio and lecturer on journalism, advertising and protocol at the ESERP university for more than a decade.  He is a member of the Associació Balear d'Amics de les Bandes Sonores (ABABS), dedicated to the promotion and dissemination of film music, with which he has collaborated on multiple occasions and participated in the XXXII Meeting of Writers and Critics of the Spanish Letters held in Pendueles (Llanes, Asturias), among other activities.

Works

Fantasy literature 
Historias de la Tierra Incontable. From 2012 to 2017, six volumes were published and from 2019 Dolmen Editorial undertook its reissue, with corrections and additions, and the publication of subsequent titles.

 Círculo Primero: el Despertar. Alberto Santos, 2012. ; Dolmen Editorial, 2019. 
 Círculo Segundo: Viaje a la Profundidad. Alberto Santos, 2013. 
 Círculo Tercero: la Música del Mundo. Alberto Santos, 2014. 
 Historias Élficas. Alberto Santos, 2015. 
 Historias de la Verdadera. Alberto Santos Editor, 2016. 
 Círculo Cuarto: las Manos del Tiempo. Alberto Santos, 2017. 
 Historias de Sirenas. Dolmen, 2019.

Comic 
 Arn, el Navegante. Dolmen Editorial, 2021.  (script by Házael González, illustrations by Raulo Cáceres)

Zombie literature 
 La Muerte Negra. Dolmen, 2010. 
 Quijote Z. Dolmen, 2010.

Film music 
 Música per al Nou Mil·lenni. Documenta Balear, 2006. 
 Casino Royale. La Música de las Películas de James Bond. Alberto Santos, 2014.

Essay 
 Danzando con la Realidad: las Creaciones Meta-Artísticas de Alejandro Jodorowsky. Dolmen, 2011.

Children's story 
 ¿De qué están hechos los sueños? Alberto Santos, 2015.

Others 
 Kama Sutra Japonés. Robinbook, 2007.

References

External links

 
 

Writers from Asturias
21st-century Spanish novelists
Living people
1976 births
Spanish film critics
University of the Balearic Islands alumni
University of Barcelona alumni
Spanish radio presenters
Spanish columnists
Spanish male novelists
21st-century Spanish male writers
People from Narcea